Skanörs Ljung Nature Reserve is situated in the South-Western part of the Scania province of Sweden, in the Vellinge Municipality between Ljunghusen and Skanör-Falsterbo. Skanörs Ljung became a designated nature reserve 1969 and encompasses a total area of 5.75 km2 of which 2.122 km2 is the marine portion.

References 

Nature reserves in Sweden
Scania
Tourist attractions in Skåne County
Geography of Skåne County
Protected areas established in 1969
1969 establishments in Sweden